The Billboard Hot 100 is a chart that ranks the best-performing singles of the United States. Published by Billboard magazine, the data are compiled by Nielsen SoundScan based collectively on each single's weekly physical sales and airplay. In 2004, there were 11 singles that topped the chart. Although there were 12 singles that claimed the top spot in the 52 issues of the chart, hip hop duo Outkast's "Hey Ya!" began its peak position in 2003, and is thus excluded.

In 2004, 13 acts achieved their first U.S. number-one single, either as a lead artist or featured guest, including Sleepy Brown, Twista, Kanye West, Jamie Foxx, Lil Jon, Fantasia Barrino, Juvenile, Soulja Slim, Terror Squad, Ciara, Petey Pablo, Snoop Dogg, and Pharrell. Barrino and Ciara were the only acts to have earned a number-one debut single this year. R&B singer Usher had four number-one singles that appeared in the 2004 issues, and Outkast had two. Soulja Slim became the sixth artist to have a number one song posthumously, after his death in November 2003. During the year, seven collaboration singles reached the number-one position, tying the record set in 2003.

Usher's "Yeah!" is the longest-running number-one single of 2004, remaining in that position for 12 straight weeks. It is followed by his other single "Burn", whose streak on the top spot reached eight non-consecutive weeks. Other singles with extended chart runs include Ciara's "Goodies", which features Petey Pablo, and Usher's "My Boo", a duet with Alicia Keys, each topping the chart for seven and six weeks, respectively.

Usher is the most successful act of 2004. He had four singles that topped the Billboard Hot 100: "Yeah!, "Burn", "Confessions Part II", and "My Boo"; he is the only act in 2004 to have earned multiple number-one singles. Overall, Usher had 28 weeks on top in a calendar year, becoming the first act to have achieved such an extended chart run on the Billboard Hot 100. The feat broke the record set by Glenn Miller and His Orchestra in 1940; their records spent 26 consecutive weeks at the top spot of Record Buying Guide, a jukebox chart Billboard magazine published in the late 1930s and early 1940s. "Yeah!" is the best-performing single of the calendar year, having topped the Top Hot 100 Hits of 2004.

Following periods of fluctuating success, urban music attained commercial dominance during the early 2000s, which featured massive crossover success on the Billboard charts by R&B and hip hop artists. In 2004, all 12 songs that topped the Billboard Hot 100 were performed by African-American recording artists and accounted for 80% of the number-one R&B hits that year. Along with Usher's streak of singles, Top 40 radio and both pop and R&B charts were topped by OutKast's "Hey Ya!", Snoop Dogg's "Drop It Like It's Hot", Terror Squad's "Lean Back", and Ciara's "Goodies". Chris Molanphy of The Village Voice later remarked that "by the early 2000s, urban music was pop music."

Chart history

Number-one artists

See also
2004 in music
Billboard Year-End Hot 100 singles of 2004
List of Billboard number-one singles

References

Additional sources
Fred Bronson's Billboard Book of Number 1 Hits, 5th Edition
Joel Whitburn's Top Pop Singles 1955-2008, 12 Edition
Joel Whitburn Presents the Billboard Hot 100 Charts: The 2000s
Additional information obtained can be verified within Billboard's online archive services and print editions of the magazine.

United States Hot 100
2004